Joseph-Armand Bombardier (April 16, 1907 – February 18, 1964) was a Canadian inventor and businessman who was the founder of Bombardier. His most famous invention was the snowmobile.

Biography
Born in Valcourt, Quebec, Joseph-Armand Bombardier dabbled in mechanics from an early age. He built his first snow vehicle at the age of 15. He acquired experience by reading, taking notes and repairing what he found until he opened his own garage at age 19, where he would repair cars and sell gasoline in the summertime.

During wintertime, he worked on developing a vehicle able to travel on snow. At that time, the Quebec government did not clear snow from secondary roads, so residents of these areas stored their cars for the winter season. The idea to build a winter vehicle came to Bombardier after a blizzard in which his young son fell ill from peritonitis and died because he could not be brought to the nearest hospital.

The first B7 (B for Bombardier and 7 for 7 passengers) snowmobiles were sold during the winter of 1936–37 and were well received. A new plant able to produce more than 200 vehicles a year was built in 1940. A new 12-passenger model was made available in 1941 which was referred to as the B12, but demand was halted when Canada entered World War II. The B12 was manufactured by L’Auto-Neige Bombardier Limitée. Bombardier also brought to market a C18 which served the public as a school bus. Over 3,000 units of the B12/C18 were manufactured. Bombardier offered his expertise to the Canadian government and started producing specialized military vehicles for the Allies. Bombardier also produced specialized vehicles for logging and mining operations, which they called the Muskeg.

After the war, business declined when the Quebec government began clearing snow from secondary roads in 1948. Bombardier went on to build smaller snowmobiles during the 1950s and developed a new market for recreational products for one or two people. In 1959 he launched his world-famous Ski-Doo, which was originally planned to be called Ski-Dog but a printing accident spelt it as Ski-Doo and Bombardier considered that typo a fortuitous development for a new trademark for his company. The Ski-Doo was ranked 17th place on CBC Television's The Greatest Canadian Invention in 2007. Bombardier died in 1964 of cancer but the snowmobile idea was a success. 225 units were sold during 1959 and more than 8,210 units were sold during 1963.

Honours
In 2004, Autoroute 55 in Quebec was named  between Stanstead and Autoroute 20 near Drummondville. The Bombardier Glacier in Antarctica is also named after him.

In 2000, Joseph-Armand Bombardier was honoured by the government of Canada with his image on a postage stamp.

He is a member of the Canadian Science and Engineering Hall of Fame.

See also
Bombardier Recreational Products
Ski-doo
Roski, a division founded by Joseph-Armand Bombardier

References

Further reading

External links
 J. Armand Bombardier Museum
Joseph-Armand Bombardier at The Canadian Encyclopedia
CBC's Bombardier: The Snowmobile Legacy
Heritage Minute about Joseph-Armand Bombardier

People from Estrie
Businesspeople from Quebec
Canadian inventors
Bombardier Inc.
1907 births
1964 deaths
Persons of National Historic Significance (Canada)
 
Joseph-Armand